Robert Rabiah is an Australian film actor best known for his roles as Hakim in Face to Face for which he was nominated for a AACTA Award for Best Supporting Actor in a Film and Best Actor at the Inside Film Awards, Nick in Chopper, Dario Mancini in Fat Tony & Co., Spiro Politis on TV soap Neighbours, Mehmet in Deadline Gallipoli, Mohsen in Ali's Wedding, Bilal in Safe Harbour, Paul `PK' Kallipolitis in Underbelly, and Sami Almasi in Secret City (TV series).

Career 
In 2000, Rabiah's first role was in the Australian film Chopper, alongside Eric Bana and Vince Colosimo. He got roles in television shows, including Blue Heelers, Stingers, Underbelly, Fat Tony & Co., and Neighbours. In 2004, he had a minor role in Evan Clarry's Under the Radar. In 2011, he was cast in Michael Rymer's Face To Face.

He later acted in the Australian romantic comedy film Ali's Wedding, action film The Shinjuku Five, 2018 drama television series Safe Harbour,  Deadline Gallipoli, Down Under, Secret City and Below.

Awards and nominations

Select filmography
 Chopper (2000)
On the Beach (2000)
The Wog Boy (2000)
Under the Radar (2004)
 Killing Time (2011)
Face to Face (2011)
Fat Tony & Co. (2014)
Deadline Gallipoli (2015)
Down Under (2016)
Neighbours (2017)
Ali's Wedding (2017)
Safe Harbour (2018)
Secret City (2018)
Below (2019)
Jack Irish (2021)

References

External links

Living people
Australian male writers
20th-century Australian male actors
21st-century Australian male actors
Australian male film actors
Australian male television actors
21st-century male writers
Male actors from Melbourne
Australian male stage actors
Australian male voice actors
Australian television presenters
Writers from Melbourne
Male actors from Sydney
1986 births